The Calabasas Pro Tennis Championships is a tennis tournament held in Calabasas, California, United States since 2001. The event was part of the ATP Challenger Tour from 2001 until 2010. However, since 2012 the tournament has been part of the ITF Men's Circuit. It is played on outdoor hard courts. Former French Open champion Michael Chang won the event in 2002.

Past finals

Singles

Doubles

External links 
Official website
ITF search

 
ATP Challenger Tour
Hard court tennis tournaments in the United States
Recurring sporting events established in 2001
Tennis in California
Calabasas, California